Pinhal Interior Norte is a former Portuguese subregion, in Centro Region, Portugal. It was abolished at the January 2015 NUTS 3 revision. The principal and most populous town is Lousã. The only city is Oliveira do Hospital.

Municipalities
 Alvaiázere
 Ansião
 Arganil
 Castanheira de Pêra
 Figueiró dos Vinhos
 Góis
 Lousã
 Miranda do Corvo
 Oliveira do Hospital
 Pampilhosa da Serra
 Pedrógão Grande
 Penela
 Tábua
 Vila Nova de Poiares

References

Former NUTS 3 statistical regions of Portugal